Nepetoideae is a subfamily of plants in the family Lamiaceae.

, the Angiosperm Phylogeny Website (APweb) accepted the following genera:

 Acanthomintha (A. Gray) Bentham & J. D. Hooker
 Aeollanthus Sprengel
 Agastache Gronovius
 Alvesia Welwitsch
 Anisochilus Bentham
 Asterohyptis Epling
 Basilicum Moench
 Benguellia G. Taylor
 Blephilia Rafinesque
 Bystropogon L'Héritier
 Cantinoa Harley & J. F. B. Pastore
 Capitanopsis S. Moore
 Catoferia (Bentham) Bentham
 Cedronella Moench
 Cleonia L.
 Clinopodium L.
 Coleus Loureiro
 Collinsonia L.
 Condea Adanson
 Conradina A. Gray
 Cuminia Colla
 Cunila L.
 Cyanocephalus (Bentham) Harley & J. F. B. Pastore
 Cyclotrichium (Boissier) Manden. & Scheng.
 Dicerandra Bentham
 Dracocephalum L.
 Drepanocaryum Pojarkova
 Elsholtzia Willdenow
 Endostemon N. E. Brown
 Eplingiella Harley & J. F. B. Pastore
 Equilabium Mwanyambo et al.
 Eriope Bentham
 Eriopidion Harley
 Eriothymus (Bentham) Schmidt
 Fuerstia T. C. E. Fries
 Glechoma L.
 Glechon Sprengel
 Gontscharovia Boriss.
 Gymneia (Bentham) Harley & J. F. B. Pastore
 Hanceola Kudô
 Haumaniastrum P. A. Duvignaud & Planke
 Hedeoma Persoon
 Hemizygia (Bentham) Briquet (accepted by APweb, but treated as a synonym of Syncolostemon by other sources)
 Hesperozygis Epling
 Heterolamium C. Y. Wu
 Hoehnea Epling
 Horminum L.
 Hoslundia Vahl
 Hypenia (Bentham) Harley
 Hyptidendron Harley
 Hyptis Jacquin
 Hyssopus L.
 Isodon (Bentham) Spach
 Keiskea Miquel (accepted by APweb, but treated as a synonym of Collinsonia by other sources)
 Killickia Bräuchler et al.
 Kurzamra Kuntze
 Lallemantia Fischer & C. A. Meyer
 Lavandula L.
 Lepechinia Willdenow
 Leptohyptis Harley & J. F. B. Pastore
 Lycopus L.
 Madlabium Hedge (treated as a synonym of Capitanopsis S.Moore by APweb, but accepted by other sources)
 Marsypianthes Bentham
 Martianthus Harley & J. F. B. Pastore
 Medusantha Harley & J. F. B. Pastore
 Meehania Britton
 Melissa L.
 Mentha L.
 Mesosphaerum P. Browne
 Micromeria Bentham
 Minthostachys (Bentham) Spach
 Monarda L.
 Monardella Bentham
 Mosla (Bentham) Maximowicz
 Nepeta L.
 Obtegomeria Cantino & Doroszenko
 Ocimum L.
 Ombrocharis Handel-Mazzetti
 Oocephalus (Bentham) Harley & J. F. B. Pastore
 Origanum L.
 Orthosiphon Bentham
 Peltodon Pohl (accepted by APweb, but treated as a synonym of Hyptis by other sources)
 Pentapleura Handel-Mazzetti
 Perilla L.
 Perillula Maximowicz
 Physominthe Harley & J. F. B. Pastore
 Piloblephis Rafinesque
 Platostoma P. Beauvois
 Plectranthus L'Héritier
 Pogogyne Bentham
 Poliomintha A. Gray
 Prunella L.
 Pycnanthemum Michaux
 Pycnostachys Hooker
 Rhabdocaulon (Bentham) Epling
 Rhaphiodon Schauer
 Rhododon Epling
 Saccocalyx Cossone & Durieu
 Salvia L.
 Satureja L.
 Schizonepeta (Bentham) Briquet
 Siphocranion Kudô
 Solenostemon Schumacher (accepted by APweb, but treated as a synonym of Coleus by other sources)
 Stachydeoma Small
 Syncolostemon Bentham
 Tetradenia Bentham
 Thorncroftia N. E. Brown
 Thymbra L.
 Thymus L.
 Zataria Boissier
 Ziziphora L.

References

Lamiaceae
Asterid subfamilies